Hybris may refer to:
 Hybris or hubris, exaggerated self pride
 Hybris (mythology), a Greek spirit (or god) of insolence
 430 Hybris, a typical Main belt asteroid

In computing:
 hybris (company), a software products company
 Hybris (video game), a 1987 computer video game
 Hybris (software), a compatibility layer for Linux
 Hybris (computer worm), an e-mail worm

In music:
 Hybris (record label), an independent record label
 Hybris (album), an album by Änglagård